The Calgary Shamrocks are a Canadian Junior box lacrosse team from Calgary, Alberta.  The Shamrocks play in the Rocky Mountain Lacrosse League's Junior B Tier I league.  On August 18, 2019, the Shamrocks became the fourth team in Alberta's history to win the Founders Cup national lacrosse championship.

History
The Shamrocks appeared at the 2006 Founders Cup in Windsor, Ontario and the 2007 event in Kamloops, British Columbia, winning bronze at both events.

In 2018, the Shamrocks returned to the national championship, this time in Akwesasne.  Despite winning four of their five games, they had to settle for fifth place, defeating Quebec's North Shore Kodiaks in their final game.

In 2019, they won their second consecutive Larry Bishop Memorial Cup as RMLL champions by sweeping the Fort Saskatchewan Rebels in two games.  Then the Shamrocks travelled to Winnipeg, Manitoba for their fourth national competition.  The Shamrocks finished the round robin in second with a 5-1 record, only losing to Ontario's Six Nations Rebels.  In the gold medal game, the Shamrocks built up a five-goal lead on the Rebels going into the third and rode it to a 16-15 win.  Calgary's Cordell Hastings was named most valuable player.

After the Enoch Tomahawks, Edmonton Miners, and Calgary Mountaineers, the Shamrocks are the fourth Albertan team to ever win the national Junior B title.

Season-by-season results
Note: GP = Games played, W = Wins, L = Losses, T = Ties, Pts = Points, GF = Goals for, GA = Goals against

Founders Cup
CANADIAN NATIONAL CHAMPIONSHIPS

References

External links
Official RMLL website
The Bible of Lacrosse

Mou
Lacrosse teams in Alberta
Sports clubs established in the 1990s
1990s establishments in Alberta